Ras al-Ayn District is a district of al-Hasakah Governorate in northeastern Syria. The administrative centre is the city of Ras al-Ayn.

At the 2004 census, the district had a population of 177,150. It is populated by Arabs, Kurds and Assyrians.

Subdistricts
The district of Ras al-Ayn is divided into two subdistricts or nawāḥī (population as of 2004):

References

 
Districts of Al-Hasakah Governorate